Nicola Ciacci is a Sammarinese footballer who plays as a forward for S.S. Pennarossa in San Marino. He made 17 appearances and scored one goal for the San Marino national team.

References

Living people
1982 births
San Marino international footballers
Association football forwards
Sammarinese footballers